Karides güveç is a shrimp dish in Turkish cuisine. It also contains tomato, tomato paste, garlic, onion, chili pepper and optionally mushroom. It is usually cooked and served in croks or relatively smaller sized güveçs, by adding melted kaşar on top of the dish.

It is considered an entrée.

See also 
 Midye dolma
 List of shrimp dishes

References 

Turkish cuisine
Shrimp dishes